Paul Crowther  (born 24 August 1953) is an English philosopher. He is a professor of philosophy and author specialising in the fields of aesthetics, metaphysics, and visual culture.  He has written nine books in the field of History of Art and Philosophy.

He was born in Leeds, West Riding of Yorkshire, and he was raised in the Belle Isle estate, Hunslet, and Middleton areas of south Leeds. He began taking an interest in art and philosophy at the age of 16. He is a proponent of an approach to aesthetics he dubbed "post-analytic phenomenology".

Career
Crowther initially enrolled at the University of Manchester to study history and politics.  He subsequently migrated to the University of Leeds where he took a joint honours degree in Philosophy and the History of Art. He was a graduate student at the University of York and also holds a teaching certificate in Classical Studies.  He obtained his doctorate in philosophy from the University of Oxford. Crowther is a former fellow of Corpus Christi College, Oxford where he was a lecturer at the Department of the History of Art and Reader in the History Faculty. He has also taught at the University of St Andrew's (Fife, Scotland), the University of Central Lancashire, and Jacobs University Bremen. Between 2009 and 2016, Crowther held the post of Chair of Philosophy at the National University of Ireland, Galway and subsequently has been emeritus professor of philosophy at the same institution.

In May 2017 Crowther was elected as a member of the Royal Irish Academy.

Philosophical work
Crowther's interests and expertise are in the fields of visual aesthetics, phenomenology, and Kant. Works by him on the philosophy of visual art have been translated into Chinese, Korean, German, and Serbian, amongst other languages.

In 2014, Crowther — together with Slovenian artist Mojca Oblak, and assistance from the Ministry of Culture of Slovenia and the Moore Institute in Galway, Ireland — organized an exhibition of Victorian art entitled Awakening Beauty at the National Gallery in Ljubljana, Slovenia.

Selected bibliography
Crowther, Paul (2009). Phenomenology of the Visual Arts (even the frame). Stanford, CA: Stanford University Press.
Crowther, Paul (2007). Defining Art, Creating the Canon: Artistic Value in an Era of Doubt. Oxford, UK: Oxford University Press.
Crowther, Paul (1997). The Language of Twentieth-Century Art: A Conceptual History. New Haven and London: Yale University Press.
Crowther, Paul (1993). Art and Embodiment: From Aesthetics to Self-Consciousness. Oxford: Oxford University Press.
Crowther, Paul (1989). The Kantian Sublime: From Morality to Art. Oxford, UK: Oxford University Press.

References

1953 births
20th-century English male writers
20th-century English philosophers
20th-century educators
20th-century essayists
20th-century English historians
21st-century English male writers
21st-century English philosophers
21st-century educators
21st-century essayists
21st-century English historians
Academics of the University of Galway
Academics of the University of Central Lancashire
Academics of the University of St Andrews
Alumni of the University of Cambridge
Alumni of the University of Leeds
Alumni of the University of Oxford
Alumni of the University of York
Analytic philosophers
British ethicists
British male essayists
Classics educators
British consciousness researchers and theorists
Cultural historians
English art critics
English art historians
English classical scholars
English essayists
English male non-fiction writers
English sociologists
Epistemologists
Fellows of Corpus Christi College, Oxford
Historians of philosophy
Academic staff of Jacobs University Bremen
Kant scholars
Literacy and society theorists
Living people
Mass media theorists
Members of the Royal Irish Academy
Metaphysics writers
Ontologists
People from Belle Isle, Leeds
Phenomenologists
Philosophers of art
Philosophers of culture
Philosophers of education
Philosophers of history
Philosophers of mind
Philosophers of social science
Philosophy academics
Social philosophers
Sociologists of art
Theorists on Western civilization